Folklore in Hawaii in modern times is a mixture of various aspects of Hawaiian mythology and various urban legends that have been passed on regarding various places in the Hawaiian islands.  The following is a partial list of some of these legends.

Ancient Hawaiian folklore

Night marchers
According to Hawaiian legend, night marchers (huaka‘i po in Hawaiian) are ghosts of ancient warriors.  They supposedly roam large sections of the island chain, and can be seen by groups of torches.  They can usually be found in areas that were once large battlefields (the Nuuanu Pali on the island of Oahu is a good example.)  Legend has it that if you look a night marcher straight in the eye, you will be forced to walk among them for eternity, but if you have a relative taken by them, you will be spared.  Hawaiians say that in the presence of night marchers, one should lie down on their stomach, face down to avoid eye contact, stay quiet, breathe shallowly, and don't move. Some say that they may nudge you to provoke a reaction so they can take you. Moanalua Gardens is one of the many places the Night Marchers are said to roam.

Carrying pork over the Nu’uanu Pali
Local folklore on the island of Oahu says that one should never carry pork over the Pali Highway connecting Honolulu and Windward Oahu.  The stories vary, but the classic legend is that if one carries pork of any kind over the old Pali road (not the modern pali highway) by automobile, the automobile would stop at a certain point on the way and not restart until the pork is removed from the vehicle.
 Some versions of the story require the pork to be raw; other versions say that this happens after dark.
 In some versions, a white dog or an old woman in a holuku will appear at the time the automobile stalls, and you must feed the pork to the dog to proceed.

This legend has its roots in ancient Hawaiian mythology.  According to legend, the Hawaiian volcano goddess Pele and the demigod Kamapua‘a (a half-man-half-pig) had a turbulent relationship, and the two agreed not to visit each other. If one takes pork over the Pali, the legend goes, one is symbolically taking a piece of Kamapua‘a from one side to the other, and it is said that Pele would stop that from happening.

Alternately, the legend is attributed to a magic dog, which was killed and cooked and put in an 'umeke to be carried over the pali and given as a gift to the mother/wife of the perpetrator. Women did not eat pork in ancient Hawaii, but were allowed to eat dog. The dog's owner followed and called to the dog, which came alive, answered from within the 'umeke, causing the carrier to drop his pole and flee. The dog then returns to its master. A dog as food was offensive to the American missionaries, and under their influence, the dog meat in the story became pork. The Pele/Kamapua'a stories were adapted to make the story fit, the old lady in the white holoku is also Pele, but that too was corrupted from other tales.

Ke-alii-ai Kanaka (The chief who eats men) 
The legend of Ke-alii-ai Kanaka comes from the middle-to-late 18th century and tells of a Man named Kokoa, who went on to become a cannibal chief who plagued two islands. In his youth, he was a renowned fighter with a brutal appetite for human flesh. His story begins and ends on Oahu. In it unknown how he came to love the taste of humans to an obsessive degree, but he was shunned from his home shortly after it was discovered by his community. He led a small group of followers up into the Waianae mountains, where they promptly vanished. Some times later, Kokoa and his band posed as a group of settlers who came to land on Kauai's shores, seeming to be from an unknown place. The King of Kauai at the time received them and even noticed multiple differences between them and what he thought Hawaiian people to be. Notably, their darker-than-usual skin complexion, odd ways of speaking and complete lack of a set of uniform laws between them. Most glaringly, their starkly contrasting religious practices. Kokoa, renaming himself Ka-Lo, integrated smoothly into the Kauai community at first. In their public ceremonies, they would feast and play as their neighbors would. In their secret ceremonies, they would cook and eat victims and sometimes children, disguising the meat as pork. The higher-ranking members of their group, namely Ka-Lo and his daughter, were festooned with plentiful tattoos and shell jewelry. The chief himself was covered head-to-toe in tattoos of the natural world. He had his daughter wed a local chief, though this does not end well for both his people and the Kauai village nearest to his area. His daughter, unknowing of them, breaks a Kapu law and is slain. Enraged by this turn of events, Ka-lo and his followers revealed their cannibalistic nature in a night of devilry. They captured people they could find and held a feast of them. Shortly after this event, they fled back to Oahu, choosing to secret themselves away into the gulch of Waianae to a plateau called "Halemanu." (House of the Hand).  This isolated location could only be reached on-foot by a single pathway, and it is from that pathway they would hunt anyone who walked it. This continued for some time, until the brother of a man named Hoahanau was kidnapped and dragged into the forest. Hoahanau was a strapping man himself, yet when he saw Ai-Kanaka's monstrous disposition, he fled the area. He would spend the next several months honing his body and reflexes with endless training and matches against any and all fighters his words could reach. When the time came for his rematch, he coated himself in oil and approached the pathway, calling out his foe's real name. Ai-kanaka, then Ka-Lo, first Kokoa, lurked out from his home and boastfully accepted the challenge unarmed. As their match ensued, he found he could not grasp the younger man's body for any grabs, nor could he match him blow-for-blow. Thrown to the ground again and again, he sprung up to flee into his home to fetch a weapon, only to be caught, knocked off balance and thrown over the edge of his plateau home into the barbed bramble of trees below.

Modern urban legends

Paradise Park/Manoa Falls hiking trail
You can apparently hear a spectre/banshee screaming while walking along the path.  Paradise Park is the never discarded name of the bird show/exhibit that was located there in the past.  It was abandoned for an unknown reason.  If one goes to the side of the parking lot you will see the overgrown ruins of a nursery.  Behind this is a covered walkway twisting its way through dilapidated cages and building, some still bearing signs telling what kind of bird was housed there.  On one side of these buildings is a small hut with a statuette of the Virgin Mary, and a Portuguese stone oven.  There is also a Japanese pagoda.  There are no records of cultural exhibits at Paradise Park, so the purpose of these buildings remains a mystery.

Events in Waialae and Kahala
At one time, the land that is now subdivisions in Waialae and Kahala Mall in eastern Honolulu were once the site of a graveyard.  Since that time, two known events have occurred there.

Mujina

Green Lady
The story of the green lady is that of a woman who would visit the gulch of Wahiawa, which also contains the Wahiawa Botanical Garden, with her children.  One day while visiting one of her children became lost and was never found. The story goes that she still wanders the gulch looking for her child, or children, and will take any child that she comes across in the gulch.  There have been several reports of seeing a green woman covered in moss or mold wandering the gulch. Others say that the green woman closely resembles that of a Japanese mythological creature called the kappa. This creature is said to resemble a turtle-like humanoid that steals children to feast upon. The last known sighting was said to have happened in the mid to late 1980s.  In modern times, children and teenagers dare each other to run across the bridge that runs over the gulch at night. Most speculators say that this story was made up to keep children from wandering into the gulch by themselves.

See also
 Glen Grant
Hawaiian mythology

References

Hawaii folklore